Kodalikaruppur  is a village in the Udayarpalayam taluk of Ariyalur district, Tamil Nadu, India.

Demographics 

As per the 2001 census, Udayanatham (West) had a total population of 3868 with 1937 males and 1931 females.

References 

Villages in Ariyalur district